Michael Carman (born 11 October 1951) is an Australian film, television, and theatre actor. He trained at St Martins Theatre from 1969 to 1971 and attended Swinburne Film and Television School from 1971 to 1974.

Filmography 
Max's Dreaming as support
A Waltz Through the Hills as Sgt Rawlins
Hercules Returns as co-lead
Mouth to Mouth as Tony
Nim's Island as cruise captain
Oz as Tin Man
Quigley Down Under as featured
Raw Deal as Sir Frederick
Roundabout as policeman
Sadisco as Dr Sadisco
Seething Night as lead
Silver City as policeman
Strange Bedfellows as Laurie
Tea & Pictures as George Lambert
The Chant of Jimmie Blacksmith as support
The Dame Was Loaded as Jake
Day of the Panther as Zukor
The Devil's Playground as Nigel
The Extra as Loftus Green
The Killer Elite as the don
The Wannabes as Jimmy King
Young Errol as theatre actor
The Silver Brumby as Currawong, Wombat, Mopoke
Strange Bedfellows as Laurie
Nim's Island as Ship Captain

References

External links 

Michael Carman Bio page
The Dame Was Loaded Credits

Living people
Date of birth unknown
1951 births